J. Linton was a Scottish professional footballer who played as a winger.

References

Scottish footballers
Association football wingers
Dundee F.C. players
Grimsby Town F.C. players
English Football League players